Emden Hauptbahnhof is the main station in Emden in the German state of  Lower Saxony. It is the terminus of the Emsland Railway, connecting Emden with Münster and the Ruhr and the starting point of the East Frisian coastal railway from Emden to Norden and Norddeich, both of which are electrified.  It is also connected to the city’s second busiest station of Emden Außenhafen (outer harbour) by a line that has been electrified since 2006.

History 
Emden Hauptbahnhof was opened in 1971 and is a grey concrete building, as was in vogue then. Because of Emden’s water-logged foundations, the platforms are not reached by a pedestrian tunnel, but via a flyover.

Until 1971, the main station in Emden was about two kilometres further east, now better known as Emden Süd (south) station. The station which is now the location of the Hauptbahnhof was called West Emden from 1935, before that it was called Larrelter Straße. Beside it was the Emden station of metre gauge line of the Emden-Pewsum-Greetsiel Light Railway.

The last buildings and tracks of Emden Süd station have now been demolished and replaced by a new residential district.

Train services 
Every day, InterCity trains run in the direction of Koblenz (via Münster, the Ruhr and Cologne) and to Cottbus and Leipzig (via Bremen and Hanover). Regional services run to Münster and via Oldenburg and Bremen to Hanover. Some of those trains that terminate in Emden, run to Emden Außenhafen and are timed to connect with the ferries to Borkum. The others terminate at the Hauptbahnhof.

The station is served by the following service(s):

Intercity services (IC/EC ) Norddeich - Emden - Münster - Düsseldorf - Köln - Bonn - Koblenz - Mainz - Mannheim - Stuttgart
Intercity services (IC ) Norddeich - Emden - Münster - Düsseldorf - Köln - Bonn - Koblenz - Mainz - Mannheim - Karlsruhe - Konstanz
Intercity services (IC ) Norddeich - Emden - Bremen - Hanover - Braunschweig - Magdeburg - Leipzig
Regional services  Norddeich - Emden - Leer - Oldenburg - Bremen - Nienburg - Hanover
Regional services  Emden - Leer - Lingen (Ems) - Rheine - Münster

References

Railway stations in Lower Saxony
Buildings and structures in Emden
Railway stations in Germany opened in 1971